Pieter Bartholomeusz Barbiers (bapt 23 January 1772, Amsterdam – 10 September 1837, Haarlem) was a Dutch painter, son of Bartholomeus Barbiers.

He married the painter Maria Geertruida Snabilie in Haarlem and was known as a historical and landscape painter. His children were Pieter Barbiers IV, Caecilia Geertruida and Maria Geertruida. In 1812 he made a view of the abbey ruins of Rijnsburg before they were demolished altogether, and this drawing was later engraved by Joannes Pieter Visser Bender.

References

Pieter Barbiers Bartholomeusz on artnet

1771 births
1837 deaths
19th-century Dutch painters
Dutch male painters
Painters from Amsterdam
19th-century Dutch male artists